Cordin is a surname. Notable people with the surname include:

Gervais Cordin (born 1998), French rugby union player
Karl Cordin (born 1948), Austrian alpine skier

See also
Corbin (surname)